Renan Guedes Borges (born 19 January 1998), known as Renan Guedes or just Guedes, is a Brazilian footballer who plays as a right back for Moldovan club Sheriff Tiraspol.

Club career
Born in São Paulo, Guedes joined Corinthians' youth setup in 2010, aged twelve. On 13 October 2017, he left the club and signed for Atlético Mineiro, being initially assigned to the under-20 squad.

Guedes made his first team debut for Galo on 9 March 2019, coming on as a late substitute for Hulk in a 1–0 Campeonato Mineiro away win against Patrocinense. On 9 September, after one further match with the team, he moved to Joinville for the year's Copa Santa Catarina.

Guedes became a regular starter for Joinville in the 2020 Série D, and scored his first senior goal on 1 October of that year, in a 2–0 home win against São Luiz. The following 21 January, he agreed to a contract with Bahia.

Initially assigned to the under-23 for the Campeonato Baiano, Guedes started to feature for Bahia's main squad in April 2021, and subsequently made his Série A debut on 29 May by starting in a 3–0 home success over Santos.

Guedes left Bahia in December 2021, after his contract expired, and moved abroad on 26 January 2022, after signing for Moldovan club Sheriff Tiraspol.

Career statistics

Honours
Bahia
Copa do Nordeste: 2021

References

External links

1998 births
Living people
Brazilian footballers
Footballers from São Paulo
Association football defenders
Campeonato Brasileiro Série A players
Campeonato Brasileiro Série D players
Clube Atlético Mineiro players
Joinville Esporte Clube players
Esporte Clube Bahia players
FC Sheriff Tiraspol players
Brazilian expatriate footballers
Brazilian expatriate sportspeople in Moldova
Expatriate footballers in Moldova